The Women's 200 metres at the 1952 Summer Olympics took place on July 25 (heats) and July 26 (final) at the Helsinki Olympic Stadium. Australian athlete Marjorie Jackson, who had already won the final in the 100 metres event, earned a second gold medal while setting two world records along the way.

Summary
Stanisława Walasiewicz (Stella Walsh)'s world record had stood through the war for almost 17 years.  The 41 year old Walsh had won the US Championship the year before but did not compete in the Olympics.  The defending champion Fanny Blankers-Koen was in Helsinki, but was suffering from skin boils.  She did not finish in the 80 metres hurdles the day before after crashing a hurdle.  That turned out to be her last competitive race.

In the second heat, Nadezhda Khnykina took down Blankers-Koen's Olympic record.  In the next race on the track, Marjorie Jackson equalled the world record of 23.6, with experimental fully automatic timing giving her a 23.73.

The following day, in the first semi-final, Jackson took the world record outright with 23.4 (23.59 automatic).  Later that day, in the final, Jackson was given lane 2, the inside lane.  Five steps after the gun, she had already made up the stagger on Bertha "Puck" Brouwer in lane 3.  From there Jackson continued to pull away, ultimately to a 4-metre victory.  On the home stretch, Brouwer found herself in second place, with Khnykina closing ground down the final straight to make it close for the remaining medals.  Brouwer, Khnykina and Jackson's Australian teammate Winsome Cripps all getting credited with the same finishing time but Brouwer getting silver and Khnykina bronze.

Results

Heats
The first round was held on July 25. The first two runners from each heat qualified for the semifinal.

Heat 1

Heat 2

Heat 3

Heat 4

Heat 5

Heat 6

Heat 7

Semifinals
The semifinals were held on July 26. The first three runners from each heat qualified to the final.

Heat 1

Heat 2

Final

References

External links
Official Olympic Report.

Athletics at the 1952 Summer Olympics
200 metres at the Olympics
1952 in women's athletics
Women's events at the 1952 Summer Olympics